Benjamin Franklin Grouard (January 4, 1819 – March 18, 1894) was one of the earliest Latter Day Saint missionaries to the Society Islands, which now constitute French Polynesia.

Grouard was born in Stratham, New Hampshire,.  He joined the Church of Jesus Christ of Latter Day Saints and in 1843 was called to go with Addison Pratt, Noah Rogers and Knowlton Hanks, with the plan to preach the gospel in Hawaii.  On the trip aboard a whaling ship, Hanks died.  Due to ship sailing schedules they were only able to reach the Society Islands.  They had many converts there and Grouard married a native woman.  When the other missionaries left Grouard stayed.

After Pratt returned he reconnected with Grouard.  In 1852, Grouard and his family returned to the United States, settling in San Bernardino, California.  In 1855, Grouard left the church and became Disfellowshipped and excommunicated.  During this time he became a spiritualist.

Grouard was the father of the army scout Frank Grouard.

References

 Dan L. Tharpp. Encyclopedia of Frontier Biography. pp. 592–593
 R. Lanier Britsch. "French Polynesia". in Arnold K. Garr, Donald Q. Cannon and Richard O. Cowan, ed., Encyclopedia of Latter-day Saint History. (Salt Lake City: Deseret Book, 2000) pp. 399-400

External links
 

1819 births
1894 deaths
19th-century Mormon missionaries
Former Latter Day Saints
American Mormon missionaries in French Polynesia
Converts to Mormonism
People from Stratham, New Hampshire
People from San Bernardino, California